Solomon Pool (April 21, 1832 – April 8, 1901) was the fourth president of the University of North Carolina.  His father was a wealthy slave-holding planter of English descent, his mother was descended from French Huguenots.  Pool entered the University of North Carolina in 1849 and graduated in 1853.  Pool became president of the university in 1869.

Notes

Further reading
Alumni Files (University of North Carolina, Chapel Hill); Samuel A. Ashe, ed., Cyclopedia of Eminent and Representative Men of the Carolinas  (1892);
Kemp P. Battle, History of the University of North Carolina (1912);
Chapel Hill Newspaper, 15 July 1973; Thomas N. Ivey, ed., Handbook of the Methodist Episcopal Church, South, In North Carolina and Almanac for 1902 (1901);
Journal of the North Carolina Annual Conference of the Methodist Episcopal Church, South  (1900);
Ralph I. Pool, "Pool Family of Pasquotank, North Carolina" (no date); Raleigh News and Observer, 3 Sept. 1950;
Van Noppen Papers (Manuscript Department, Duke University Library, Durham).

External links
Official UNC Biography

1832 births
1901 deaths
Leaders of the University of North Carolina at Chapel Hill
People from Elizabeth City, North Carolina